Hina Khan (born 2 October 1987) is an Indian actress who appears in Hindi television and films. She is known for playing Akshara in Star Plus's Yeh Rishta Kya Kehlata Hai and Komolika in Kasautii Zindagii Kay 2. In 2017, she participated in the reality shows Fear Factor: Khatron Ke Khiladi 8 and Bigg Boss 11 and emerged as the runner up in both.

Early life
Khan was born on 2 October 1987 in Srinagar, Jammu and Kashmir, India into a Kashmiri Muslim family to father Aslam Khan. She belongs to a family of 4 - her parents, herself and her younger brother, Aamir Khan, who is the owner of a travel agency company. She completed her Master of Business Administration (MBA) in 2009 from the CCA School of Management in Gurgaon.

Personal life
Khan has been dating Yeh Rishta Kya Kehlata Hais supervising producer Rocky Jaiswal since 2014. She had confirmed that she suffers from asthma on Fear Factor: Khatron Ke Khiladi 8.

Career
Khan auditioned for Sony TV's singing reality show Indian Idol where she managed to be in the top 30 in 2008. Later, during her college studies in Delhi, Khan auditioned for Yeh Rishta Kya Kehlata Hai when her friends forced her and got selected for it. She moved to Mumbai and made her television debut in 2009, when she starred in one of the longest running Indian soap operas as Akshara Singhania. After eight years, she quit the show in November 2016 to pursue other projects. Her performance in the series earned her positive critical reviews and also won her multiple awards.

In 2017, she joined Colors TV's Fear Factor: Khatron Ke Khiladi 8 as a contestant, where she finished as the 1st runner up.

In September 2017, she participated in Colors TV's reality show, Bigg Boss 11 as a celebrity contestant. She survived for fifteen weeks and became one of the four finalists and emerged as the first runner up in January 2018.

In late February 2018, she wrapped up the shooting of a Punjabi music video with Sonu Thukral, which released in March 2018. On 31 March, it was announced that she had signed in to make her digital debut with Ankoosh Bhatt's short film, 'SmartPhone', opposite actor Kunaal Roy Kapur. In July 2018, Hina appeared in a Sonu Thukral's Punjabi music video "Bhasoodi". In October 2018, she bagged the role of Komolika, an antagonist in Kasautii Zindagii Kay however she left the show in April 2019 and got replaced by Aamna Sharif. In the same year, she signed her debut film Lines, opposite actress Farida Jalal, which is directed by Hussain Khan and written by Rahat Kazmi and Shakti Singh.

On 2 January 2019, she signed another short film Soulmate, opposite actor Vivan Bhatena. The film was directed by Pawwan Sharma. In May 2019, she shot for Rahat Kazmi's short film "Wish List" opposite actor Jitendra Rai. In September, she began shooting for Rahat Kazmi's third film, the Indo-Hollywood' movie called 'The Country of the Blind' as Gosha. In the same month, she signed a psychological crime drama, digital series called "Damaged 2".

In January 2020, she signed a ZEE5 horror film opposite actor Kushal Tandon. Khan played the main lead in a cameo appearance in the fifth season of Ekta Kapoor's Naagin along with Dheeraj Dhoopar and Mohit Malhotra. In February 2020, Khan made her Bollywood entry with the film Hacked, with director Vikram Bhatt, alongside Sid Makkar. In October 2020, Khan returned to Bigg Boss in its fourteenth season as a toofani senior along with Gauahar Khan and Sidharth Shukla for the first three weeks. In May 2021, Khan appeared in the music video song for T-Series song 'Patthar Wargi' alongside Tanmay Ssingh. In June 2021, Khan appeared in her next song 'Baarish Ban Jana' along with Shaheer Sheikh, which was shot in Kashmir. The song was sung by Stebin Ben & Payal Dev.

In September 2021, her Music Video 'Main bhi Barbaad' was released, opposite Angad Bedi sung by Yasser Desai

In March 2022, she announced her next web series titled "Seven One" where she's playing a cop.

Other work and media image 

Khan has also appeared as a guest in many serials. Her first guest appearance was in Kayamath in 2009 followed by Kis Desh Mein Hai Meraa Dil and Sabki Laadli Bebo. After that she appeared as a guest in Sapna Babul Ka... Bidaai, Saath Nibhaana Saathiya and Chand Chupa Badal Mein in 2010. In 2011 she appeared as a guest in Chef Pankaj Ka Zayka a cooking show. In December 2016, Khan made an appearance on Bigg Boss 10 as a panellist to support good friend Rohan Mehra.

She was named in the Top 50 Sexiest Asian Women List by Eastern Eye in 2013, 2014, 2015, 2016, and 2017. In 2014, she was listed eight among the "35 Hottest Actresses in Indian Television" by MensXP.com, an Indian lifestyle website for men. She was included in fourth place on "Television's Top 10 Actresses" list by Rediff.

Khan earned the title of Sher Khan in Bigg Boss 11.  She was also named the Most Favorite Actress of 2017 by Biz Asia.

In the same year, she became the victim of troll for posting the image of her teddy bear named 'Pooh' when saving her co-contestant Luv Tyagi during the task in Bigg Boss.

On 2 April, she walked the ramp for Streax Professional in Mumbai for marigold collection. Hina was awarded "Style Diva of Television Industry" at 11th Gold Awards Hina appeared on the cover of FHM India December 2018 edition. Khan was entered Times of India's "Most Desirable Women on Television" in 2018 and 2019 where she was at the number one position. She was also ranked in "The Times Most Desirable Women" at No. 19 in 2018, at No. 29 in 2019.

Filmography

Films

Television

Special appearances

Web series

Music videos

Awards

See also 

 List of Hindi television actresses
 List of Indian television actresses
 List of Hindi film actresses

References

External links

 
 

1987 births
Actresses in Hindi television
Living people
Indian people of Kashmiri descent
Indian soap opera actresses
Indian television actresses
Participants in Indian reality television series
Kashmiri actors
Actresses from Jammu and Kashmir
People from Srinagar
Kashmiri people
Bigg Boss (Hindi TV series) contestants
Fear Factor: Khatron Ke Khiladi participants
Indian women